The Klasika Primavera is a single-day road bicycle race held annually in April in Amorebieta, Spain. Since 2005, the race is organised as a 1.1 event on the UCI Europe Tour.

Established in 1946 as Gran Premio de Primavera, it is now held as Klasika Primavera. It is also known as Clásica de Amorebieta.

Winners

External links
  

 
UCI Europe Tour races
Cycle races in the Basque Country
Recurring sporting events established in 1946
1946 establishments in Spain